Missile Command 3D is a shoot 'em up video game developed by Virtuality Entertainment and published by Atari Corporation for the Atari Jaguar in North America on December 12, 1995, and Europe on December 15 of the same year. Part of Atari Corp.'s 2000 series, it is an update to Dave Theurer's 1980 arcade game Missile Command and the only officially released title that features support for the unreleased Jaguar VR peripheral.

Following the same premise as with the original arcade game, the player must defend six cities in their zone from being destroyed as a regional commander of three anti-missile batteries by attacking an endless hail of ballistic missiles, some of which split like multiple independently targetable reentry vehicles, with new weapons being introduced in later levels.

Missile Command 3D received mixed to positive reception since its release but it has been recently referred by publications like PC Magazine as one of the best titles for the system. A port for the PC was planned to be published by Atari Interactive, but it was never released.

Gameplay 

Missile Command 3D retains the same gameplay elements from its 1980 counterpart such as defending six cities from being attacked and destroyed by an endless wave of missiles, with new enemy weapons being introduced in later levels by commanding 3 anti-missile batteries. However, the game is now divided into three different modes to choose from at the start of the game, each with their own self-contained plot and gameplay elements. High-scores and other settings made by the player are kept via the cartridge's internal EEPROM and the game also features support for the ProController.

Modes 
Original Missile Command is a recreation of the original arcade game. This mode is played by moving a crosshair across the sky background and pressing one of three buttons to launch a counter-missile from the corresponding battery and these explode upon reaching the crosshair, leaving a fireball that persists for several seconds and destroys any enemy missiles that are caught in the zone as a result. Each of the three batteries have ten missiles to start with and they become useless when all of its missiles are fired or if it is destroyed by enemy fire. The level ends either by destroying all the enemy fire or when they reach its set target, with later levels increasing in difficulty and introducing new types of enemy weapons such as the smart bomb, which actively avoids the fireballs left by the player's counter-missiles and can only be destroyed by firing directly to it. Completing a level rewards the player bonus points depending on his performance and destroyed cities can be rebuilt by reaching 10,000 points. The game is over once all the cities are destroyed or the player does not have bonus points to rebuild cities. The mode also allows the player to change the standard background border for other ones, such as a television, an arcade cabinet or an Atari Lynx by pressing 9 on the controller keypad, among other features.

3D Missile Command is mostly similar to Original Missile Command, but the premise now revolves around a group of interstellar colonists starting anew in a planet from a distant planetary system but they are soon attacked by an alien race, who are also looking for a new solar system to inhabit. The mode controls and plays similarly to Original mode but now rendered in 3D and the playfield is larger, requiring the player to move the crosshair/camera angle around the area. A radar is now present in the bottom-center of the screen that shows upcoming enemy missiles and vehicles. Asteroids are a new addition to the mode and they will come down to destroy cities, having a similar behavior to the missiles. New to the mode are different missile types and power-ups, which are given to the player by cities that are constantly upgrading after completing a wave, among other additions. Power-ups are also randomly dropped by enemies after being destroyed. As with the original mode, destroyed cities are rebuilt after reaching 10,000 points and the game also ends once all the cities are destroyed or the player does not have enough bonus points to reconstruct them.

Virtual Missile Command takes place in the year 2157, where humans have managed to colonize planets due to the invention of a faster-than-light drive in 2034, making interstellar travel possible but one of newly formed colonies on a planet is under attack from aliens, capable of controlling creatures from the colonized planet to destroy them and is up to the player to defeat the alien race and their forces. Although it inherits the same game design and mechanics from the two previous modes, Virtual mode is played in a first-person perspective instead, with the player's primary main defense mechanism against enemy missiles and enemies themselves on the battery are now lasers, resigning the missiles as a secondary defense mechanism. Players can also move between batteries by pressing either 1, 3, 4 or 6 on the controller's keypad. Similarly to 3D mode, power-ups are randomly dropped by destroyed enemy aircraft and they range from laser upgrades, which improves the firepower of the battery's laser cannons up to four times, ammo to refill laser energy and missiles, among others. There are only three stages in this mode, each one divided into three waves and having their own thematic. In addition, bosses are now introduced at the end of each wave. The game ends once all cities or batteries in the level are destroyed. It is the only mode that features support for the unreleased Jaguar VR headset.

Development and release 

Plans for a virtual reality headset for the Jaguar were set before the system was officially launched to market, with Atari Corporation originally approaching to Virtuality Group in 1993 but they did not settled an agreement with the latter for unknown reasons, but in October 1994 Atari Corp. announced their partnership with Virtuality to create a headset for the Jaguar that would have been released on stores by Christmas 1995 and was originally set to be retailed at US$200. The development of the headset for the system was started before Nintendo officially unveiled their own virtual reality console, the Virtual Boy, a month later. The unit itself was revealed at WCES 1995, with both GameFan and GamePro magazines showcasing a mock up design of the headset in their January and February 1995 issues respectively.

Missile Command 3D was originally unveiled at E3 1995 under the working title Missile Command 2000 in a very early but playable state, showcasing the Jaguar VR headset's capabilities in action. However, both Edge and Next Generation magazines pointed out in their July and August 1995 issues respectively that the prototype on the show floor was an arcade system board from Virtuality disguised as the Jaguar VR and that the retail price was increased to US$300. Zone Hunter, a virtual reality first-person shooter arcade game by the same developer, was also announced to be released for the Jaguar VR and a demo was created for demonstration purposes, with plans to be released alongside the headset at launch that never materialized.

Both Missile Command 2000 and the Jaguar VR headset were covered by video game outlets who were invited to Atari Corp.'s US and UK divisions. Although the game was released in December under its final name, the Jaguar VR continued to be promoted in magazines but on October of the same year, the deal between the two companies was falling through. In 1996, the agreement with Virtuality was abandoned, leaving the planned headset unreleased, with Atari Corp. themselves citing health issues as one of the reasons for its cancellation. Virtuality never received any payment from Atari Corp. for their work on the peripheral. The game was also showcased during the Fun 'n' Games Day event hosted by Atari.

In an interview with online magazine Jaguar Explorer Online in March 1997, programmer Martin Brownlow recounted about the development process of Missile Command 3D after it was released. Martin stated that the project took six months to complete and despite being initially skeptical to work on a virtual reality version of Missile Command, he nevertheless decided to be involved with it. He also said the game had a troubled development cycle due to lack of support and meddling from Atari themselves and that the dragon boss found in the second stage of Virtual mode was inspired by Panzer Dragoon on Sega Saturn.

Missile Command 3D was included as part of the Atari 50: The Anniversary Celebration compilation for Nintendo Switch, PlayStation 4, Steam, and Xbox One, marking its first re-release.

Reception 

Missile Command 3D received mixed to positive reviews when it was released.

Next Generation reviewed the Jaguar version of the game, and stated that "perhaps if the gameplay had been built upon to an even further extent, the game would have more of an impact, but as it is, there's just not much to get excited about".

Legacy 
Prior to the release of Missile Command 3D, a virtual reality arcade game titled Missile Command VR was also developed and released by Virtuality under the license of Atari Games in 1994 and used the 2000SU hardware model.

After Atari Corporation discontinued the Jaguar and merged with JT Storage in 1996, all prototypes of the Jaguar VR headset were allegedly destroyed, however two working prototype units, one in low-resolution with red and grey-colored pieces and another in high-resolution with blue and grey-colored pieces, have since been recovered by private video game collectors and they are regularly showcased alongside Missile Command 3D and an earlier build of the game titled Missile Command VR at multiple Jaguar-dedicated festivals such as JagFest 2K1 and other retro gaming-themed conventions and festivals.

Besides Zone Hunter, other games were planned to be developed and released for the Jaguar by Virtuality such as the 1991 arcade mech game Exorex, a virtual reality version of Space Invaders, a racing game titled Classic Traxx, conversions of Buggy Ball and Dactyl Nightmare, among others.

In a 2016 forum post at AtariAge by video game collector Clint Thompson, with Martin Brownlow, former Virtuality CEO Jonathan D. Waldern and other former employees of the company, it was stated that the source code of Missile Command 3D has become lost with time, due to the developer splitting into multiple companies between 1999 and 2001. A third Jaguar VR prototype unit was found on September 14, 2017.

References

External links 
 Missile Command 3D at AtariAge
 Missile Command 3D at GameFAQs
 Missile Command 3D at MobyGames

1995 video games
Atari games
Atari video game compilations
Atari Jaguar games
Cancelled PC games
First-person video games
Single-player video games
Shoot 'em ups
Video games developed in the United Kingdom
Video games set in the 22nd century
Virtual reality games
Virtuality games